John Leslie (c. 163027 July 1681), son of John Leslie, 6th Earl of Rothes, was the 7th Earl of Rothes and 1st Duke of Rothes. According to tradition, he was a descendant of Princess Beatrix, sister of King Malcolm III of Scotland. His family had intermarried with both the Stuarts and the Bruces.

Life
Leslie was born in 1630. His mother died when he was ten, and on his father's death in the following year, he succeeded to the peerage. He was placed under the care of John Lindsay, 17th Earl of Crawford, to whose daughter he was betrothed. On account of the wars, his education was much neglected. "He had," says Burnet, "no advantage of education, no sort of literature; nor had he travelled abroad; all in him was mere nature". 

He was captured at the Battle of Worcester in 1651, his estates were sequestrated by the parliament, and on 18 September he was committed to the Tower of London. On 18 July 1652, his liberty was extended to ten miles from the city of London. On 14 December 1652, he was permitted, on heavy security, to go to Scotland on business for three months; similar permission was granted in 1653 and 1654, and in 1654–5 he was permitted to stay six months at Newcastle. 

On 8 January 1656/57 he obtained leave, owing, it is told, to the influence of Elizabeth Murray, countess of Dysart, to visit Scotland again. In January 1658, he was, however, committed to the castle of Edinburgh by Cromwell, to prevent a duel between him and Viscount Morpeth, who was jealous of the attentions which Rothes paid his wife; he was released the following December.

Leslie was one of the first noblemen to wait on Charles II on his arrival from Breda in 1660, and on 20 December was appointed colonel of one of the Fife regiments of horse. King Charles II made him the Lord High Treasurer of Scotland, Lord Keeper of the Great Seal of Scotland, Lord Chancellor of Scotland for life (in 1667), and President of the Privy Council of Scotland. He carried the sword of state at the coronation of Charles II.

In 1663, when he succeeded his father-in-law as Lord High Treasurer, he was sworn a privy councillor of England, and was appointed Captain of the troop of lifeguards and general of the forces in Scotland. He also received a re-grant in 1663 of the earldom of Rothes, together with the title of Lord Leslie and Ballinbreich. 

He was considered over-zealous in his persecution of Covenanters and insufficiently attentive to the defence of Leith against attack by the Dutch. On 16 April 1667 he was deprived of all his offices, but in October was made lord chancellor for life. Through the intervention of the Duke of York, he was on 29 May 1680 created Duke of Rothes, Marquis of Balleobreich, Earl of Leslie, Viscount of Lugton, Lord Auchmutie and Caskiebery.

He married Anne Crawford-Lindsay, daughter of John Lindsay, 17th Earl of Crawford. He built the Palace of Leslie (also known as Leslie House), which nearly burnt completely in a fire on Christmas Day 1763. 

John died at Holyrood Palace in Edinburgh on 27 July 1681. He was awarded a state funeral. The funeral procession was more elaborate and impressive than either Wellington's or Churchill's. It stretched over seventeen miles (27 km) long. The cost of whole regiments of ceremonial guards, soldiers, banners, trumpets, heralds and coaches effectively ruined the family finances forever, and he left behind a huge debt to his daughter, Margaret Leslie.

Family
He had two daughters: 
 Margaret, who married Charles Hamilton, 5th Earl of Haddington
 Christian (1661–1710)
As he had no male issue, the Dukedom of Rothes became extinct, the Earldom only being passed to his daughter.

References

Attribution:

External links
Clan Leslie Trust

1681 deaths
Rothes, 101
Presidents of the Privy Council of Scotland
Cavaliers
Year of birth uncertain
Lords High Commissioner to the Parliament of Scotland
Members of the Parliament of Scotland 1661–1663
Members of the Convention of the Estates of Scotland 1665
Members of the Convention of the Estates of Scotland 1667
Lord High Treasurers of Scotland
17th-century Scottish politicians
17th-century Scottish people
Commissioners of the Treasury of Scotland
Extraordinary Lords of Session